Hajdúhadház is a district in northern part of Hajdú-Bihar County. Hajdúhadház is also the name of the town where the district seat is found. The district is located in the Northern Great Plain Statistical Region. This district is a part of Hajdúság historical and geographical region.

Geography 
Hajdúhadház District borders with Nyíregyháza District and Nagykálló District (Szabolcs-Szatmár-Bereg County) to the north, Debrecen District to the east and south, Hajdúböszörmény District to the west. The number of the inhabited places in Hajdúhadház District is 3.

Municipalities 
The district has 2 towns and 1 village.
(ordered by population, as of 1 January 2012)

The bolded municipalities are cities.

Demographics

In 2011, it had a population of 22,183 and the population density was 162/km².

Ethnicity
Besides the Hungarian majority, the main minority is the Roma (approx. 2,500).

Total population (2011 census): 22,183
Ethnic groups (2011 census): Identified themselves: 22,195 persons:
Hungarians: 19,661 (88.58%)
Gypsies: 2,280 (10.27%)
Others and indefinable: 254 (1.14%)
Approx. 50 persons in Hajdúhadház District did declare more than one ethnic group at the 2011 census.

Religion
Religious adherence in the county according to 2011 census:

Reformed – 6,972;
Catholic – 2,462 (Roman Catholic – 1,413; Greek Catholic – 1,049);
other religions – 1,061; 
Non-religious – 6,498; 
Atheism – 188;
Undeclared – 5,002.

Gallery

See also
List of cities and towns of Hungary

References

External links
 Postal codes of the Hajdúhadház District

Districts in Hajdú-Bihar County